Dalma range refers to the continuation of an assemblage of hills stretching over Jharkhand and West Bengal states in India.

Tourism 

 Hanuman Temple
 Shiva Temple
 Pindrabera FRH
 Majhlabandh
 Nichlabandh
 Bamboo hut
 Natural Interpretation Center
 Deer Enclosure
 Elephant Rescue Center

See also 

 Dalma Wildlife Sanctuary

References 

Hills of Jharkhand
Hills of West Bengal